Josephina Kalleo (1920 – 1993) was a visual artist from Nain, Newfoundland and Labrador, known for her colorful drawings of traditional Inuit life and for her book Taipsumane: A Collection of Labrador Stories (1984).

Biography
Kalleo was born in Nain in 1920, and educated at the Moravian Mission there. She began drawing in her sixties, after raising five children. She became interested in recording her experiences while working at the Torng'sok Cultural Centre in Nain, where her job involved transcribing tapes of spoken Inuktitut. Using felt-tip markers, she drew vibrant, detailed scenes of Labrador Inuit life, documenting activities such as hunting and fishing, berry picking, marriage, and Christmas preparations. She drew on paper, and attached her drawings to standard-issue office file folders.

Kalleo's drawings have been included in exhibitions including North and South: Tradition, Invention and Intervention in Labrador (2002, The Rooms), and SakKijâjuk: Art and Craft from Nunatsiavut (2017, curated by Heather Igloliorte).

Taipsumane: A Collection of Labrador Stories
In 1984, 45 of Kalleo's drawings were published in the book Taipsumane: A Collection of Labrador Stories. Taipsumane is an Inuktitut word meaning "Them Days," and the book includes Kalleo's descriptions of her childhood life in the 1920s and 30s. With titles such as Festive Dress, Traditional Foods, The Spring Camp, Unequal Trading, and Women as Trappers, the carefully labelled drawings illustrate traditional ways of gathering food and seasonal activities. Reviewer Roberta Buchanan noted that "Kalleo's vision is essentially elegiac, mourning for a past way of life and past values." The text appears in Inuktitut syllabics, Moravian Inuktitut (using the English alphabet), and English.

Taipsumane has been integrated into the Newfoundland and Labrador school curriculum, and has been described as "a vital document for the transmission of Inuit cultural knowledge among youth who grew up in a post-contact era." A 2018 Globe and Mail article notes that "These drawings, along with the oral history she recorded for each image, are considered one of the best descriptions of transitional Labrador Inuit life during the mid-20th century."

Bibliography
 Taipsumane: A Collection of Labrador Stories (Nain, Newfoundland: TorngaÌ‚sok IlusituKanginni, 1984)

Notes

External links 
Heritage Newfoundland and Labrador - Josephina Kalleo, July 2013
Concordia University - Canadian Women Artists History Initiative - Josephina Kalleo, December 2018

1920 births
1993 deaths
Inuit artists
Artists from Newfoundland and Labrador
People from Nain, Newfoundland and Labrador
Pre-Confederation Newfoundland and Labrador people
Canadian mixed media artists
Canadian women artists
History of the Labrador Province of the Moravian Church